Fóstbrœðra saga or The Saga of the Sworn Brothers is one of the Icelanders' sagas. It relates the deeds of the sworn brothers Þorgeir and Þormóðr in early 11th century Iceland and abroad. Þorgeir is a capable and insanely brave warrior. He kills people for trifles and for sport. Þormóðr is a more complicated character; warrior, trouble-maker, womanizer and poet. The saga contains poetry attributed to him, including parts of a lay on his blood brother.
It is said that a cairn called Þorgeirsdys, identifies the place of death and burial of Þorgeir. This is located on the Hraunhafnartangi peninsula, just south of the modern lighthouse.

Manuscripts and dating

The saga survives in three early manuscripts. Each has a rather different version of the text:
 Hauksbók (earlier fourteenth century), beginning missing due to lost pages
 Möðruvallabók (mid-fourteenth century), end missing due to lost pages
 Flateyjarbók (c. 1390)

The date of composition of the lost written archetype of Fóstbrœðra saga has been the subject of considerable dispute. Sigurður Nordal argued for ca. 1200 (Björn K. Þórólfsson and Guðni Jónsson 1943: lxxii) whereas Jónas Kristjánsson argued for the end of the century (1972, 310). There is no clear consensus, though Andersson's 2013 analysis preferred an early dating of 'presumably not much later than 1200' (2013, 72).

A long-standing controversy centers on which manuscripts represent the most original version. In particular, the debate has focused on several unusual "clauses" (Icelandic klausur) or asides in the saga which do not fit in with conventional saga style. These have been understood both as late interpolations and as signs of an early, developing saga style (Jónas Kristjánsson 1972).

The skaldic stanzas attributed to Þormóðr kolbrúnarskáld Bersason appear genuine (according to Guðni Jónsson in Björn K. Þórólfsson and Guðni Jónsson 1943: lxi); he would have composed ca. 1010-1030 (according to Guðni Jónsson in Björn K. Þórólfsson and Guðni Jónsson 1943: lxix).

Critical reception
In the words of Lee M. Hollander (1949, 75),

The saga of the Sworn Brothers, Thorgeir and Thormod, occupies a position of secondary importance among the Old Icelandic family sagas—at least, it is not a favorite. There are good reasons for this: it does not have the scope and weight of such sagas as Njála, Eigla, Laxdæla, nor the depth and classic form of such as Hrafnkels saga, Gísla saga, Thorsteins saga hvíta; nor do students of Germanic antiquities value it because of any wealth of specific information on the history, religion, culture, laws of the Old North.

However, the saga has recently come to critical attention for the range and detail of its portrayals of women (Gos 2009).

Influence
The saga is the basis for Halldór Laxness's novel Gerpla, and a key source for Dauðans óvissi tími, a 2004 novel by Þráinn Bertelsson.

Bibliography
For a full bibliography of Fóstbræðra saga see Ryan E. Johnson, 'From the Westfjords to World Literature: A Bibliography on Fostbræðra saga', Scandinavian-Canadian Studies/Études scandinaves au Canada, 26 (2019), 312–19.

Editions

 Björn K. Þórólfsson (ed.), Fóstbrœðra saga, Samfund til udgivelse af gammel nordisk litteratur, 49 (Copenhagen: Jørgensen, 1925–27). (A diplomatic edition of all the main MSS.)
  (Normalised edition, with the main text following Möðruvallabók and its manuscript copies as far as it extends, giving the Hauksbók text at the foot of the page, and then giving the Hauksbók as the main text; various additional readings found in Flateyjarbók are also given.)
 
 Digitised text at Netútgáfan.

Translations

 The Sagas of Kormák and the Sworn Brothers, trans. by Lee M. Hollander (New York: Princeton University Press, 1949), pp. 83–176 (following Möðruvallabók as far as that goes − to chapter 20 — and Hauksbók thereafter).
 The Saga of the Sworn Brothers. Translated by Martin S. Regal. In: Viðar Hreinsson (General Editor): The Complete Sagas of Icelanders including 49 Tales. Reykjavík: Leifur Eiríksson Publishing, 1997. Volume II, pp. 329–402. .

Secondary literature

 Arnold, Martin, The Post-Classical Icelandic Family Saga, Scandinavian Studies, 9 (Lewiston: Mellen, 2003), pp. 141–80 (=chapter 4, ‘Beyond Independence, towards Post-Classicism, and the Case of Fóstbrœðra saga’)
 Andersson, Theodore M., 'Redating Fóstbrœðra saga ', in Dating the Sagas: Reviews and Revisions, ed. by Else Mundal (Copenhagen: Museum Tusculanum Press, 2013), pp. 55–76.
 
 Harris, Richard L. "'Jafnan segir inn ríkri ráð': Proverbial Allusion and the Implied Proverb in Fóstbrœðra saga." In New Norse Studies: Essays on the Literature and Culture of Medieval Scandinavia, edited by Jeffrey Turco, 61–97. Islandica 58. Ithaca: Cornell University Library, 2015. http://cip.cornell.edu/cul.isl/1458045711
 Jónas Kristjánsson, Um fóstbræðrasögu, Rit (Stofnun Árna Magnússonar á Íslandi), 1 (Reykjavík: Stofnun Árna Magnússonar, 1972)
 Poole, Russell, Skaldsagas: Text, Vocation, and Desire in the Icelandic Sagas of Poets, Erganzungsbande Zum Reallexikon Der Germanischen Altertumskunde, 27 (Berlin: de Gruyter, 2001)

References

External links
Full text of the saga in Old Icelandic (with modernised spelling)
Information on the manuscripts of the saga
Proverbs in Fóstbrœðra saga
Full text at the Icelandic Saga Database

Sagas of Icelanders